Tremella is a genus of fungi in the family Tremellaceae. All Tremella species are parasites of other fungi and most produce anamorphic yeast states. Basidiocarps (fruit bodies), when produced, are gelatinous and are colloquially classed among the "jelly fungi". Over 100 species of Tremella (in its wide sense) are currently recognized worldwide. One species, Tremella fuciformis, is commercially cultivated for food.

Taxonomy

History
Tremella was one of the original genera created by Linnaeus in his Species Plantarum of 1753. The name comes from the Latin tremere meaning "to tremble". Linnaeus placed Tremella in the algae, including within it a variety of gelatinous growths, including seaweeds, cyanobacteria, and myxomycetes, as well as fungi. Subsequent authors added additional species to this mix, until Persoon revised Tremella in 1794 and 1801, repositioning the genus within the fungi.

Persoon's reinterpretation of Tremella was sufficiently radical to be considered a separate genus (Tremella Pers.) from that originally created by Linnaeus (Tremella L.).  Tremella Pers. has now been conserved under the International Code of Nomenclature for algae, fungi, and plants, with Tremella mesenterica as the type species.

Current status
Molecular research, based on cladistic analysis of DNA sequences, has shown that Tremella (as previously understood) is polyphyletic (and hence artificial), with most species not closely related to the type. Accordingly, some species have been transferred to new genera and new families: Tremella foliacea and related species are now placed in the genus Phaeotremella within the family Phaeotremellaceae; Tremella encephala and related species are now placed in the genus Naematelia within the Naemateliaceae; Tremella moriformis and related species are now placed in the genus Pseudotremella within the Bulleraceae; and Tremella polyporina is now placed in the genus Carcinomyces within the Carcinomycetaceae. Several other species groups have not yet been renamed, pending further research. 

More than 500 species have been described in Tremella, but most of these are old names of doubtful application or old names for species later transferred to other genera. In its strict sense, the genus Tremella  now contains some 30-40 species, including the type Tremella mesenterica and the cultivated species T. fuciformis.

Description
Fruit bodies (when present) are gelatinous. In some species they are small (under 5 mm across) and pustular to pulvinate (cushion-shaped). In others they are much larger (up to 150 mm across) and may be variously lobed, cephaliform (like a brain, with folds and ridges), or foliose (with leaf-like or seaweed-like fronds). Many Tremella species, however, are hymenial parasites, producing spores within the fruit bodies of their hosts, and are only visible microscopically.

Microscopic characters
Tremella species produce hyphae that are typically (but not always) clamped and have haustorial cells from which hyphal filaments seek out and penetrate the hyphae of the host. The basidia are "tremelloid" (globose to ellipsoid, sometimes stalked, and vertically or diagonally septate), giving rise to long, sinuous sterigmata or epibasidia on which the basidiospores are produced. These spores are smooth, globose to ellipsoid, and germinate by hyphal tube or by yeast cells. Conidiophores are often present, producing conidiospores that are similar to yeast cells.

Habitat and distribution
Species are mainly parasitic on wood-rotting fungi in the phyla Ascomycota and Basidiomycota, particularly on species that occur on dead attached branches. Hosts include members of the corticioid fungi and Dacrymycetales in the Basidiomycota and species of Diaporthe, other Sordariomycetes, and lichens in the Ascomycota. Some Tremella species parasitize the fruit bodies of their hosts, others parasitize the mycelium within the wood.

As a group, Tremella species occur worldwide, though individual species may have a more restricted distribution.

Species and hosts
The list below includes species of Tremella (in the wide sense) that have recently been described or redescribed based on fruit bodies. Species based on yeasts are not included. Some additional older species may also be valid, but lack a modern description. The type locality  (but not the wider distribution) is given for each species together with the host fungus, where known. Species belonging to Tremella in the strict sense are marked as such, as are those that have been transferred to new genera.

References

Tremellomycetes